Shérazad Reix (née Benamar; born 3 April 1989) is a retired French tennis player.

Reix has career-high WTA rankings of 204 in singles, attained on 11 July 2016, and No. 219 in doubles, achieved on 10 April 2017. She won seven singles titles and nine doubles titles on the ITF Circuit in her career.

In May 2015, she and her women's doubles partner Clothilde de Bernardi received a wildcard to play in the 2015 French Open where they lost in the first round of the Grand Slam tournament.

She is married to French player Clément Reix.

In 2023, Reix was banned from professional tennis for four years and fined $30,000 after being found guilty of six match fixing offences by the International Tennis Integrity Agency.

ITF Circuit finals

Singles: 20 (7 titles, 13 runner–ups)

Doubles: 21 (9–12)

References

External links
 
 

French female tennis players
1989 births
Living people
French sportspeople of Algerian descent
Match fixing in tennis
Match fixers